Marek Vokáč (6 December 1958 – 14 November 2021) was a Czech chess player who received the FIDE title of Grandmaster (GM) in 1999. He was the Czech champion in 1999 and runner-up in 1995.

References

External links

 
 
 
 
 
 

1958 births
2021 deaths
Czech chess players
Chess grandmasters
Sportspeople from Prague